The city of Lincolnton is the county seat of Lincoln County, Georgia, United States. The population was 1,480 at the 2020 census. It contains numerous houses and historic districts listed on the National Register of Historic Places. Both the city and the county were named for General Benjamin Lincoln, who served in the Continental Army during the American Revolution.

History
Lincolnton was founded in 1798 as seat of the newly formed Lincoln County. It was incorporated as a town in 1817 and as a city in 1953.

Geography
Lincolnton is located in central Lincoln County at  (33.794414, -82.476450). U.S. Route 378 passes through the center of town as Washington Street, leading southwest  to Washington, and northeast  to McCormick, South Carolina. Georgia State Route 79 leads northwest  to Elberton, while State Route 43 leads south  to Thomson.

The west side of the city drains to Florence Creek, while the east side drains to Dry Fork Creek, both of which flow to Soap Creek, an arm of the Savannah River within Lake Strom Thurmond (Clarks Hill Lake).

Demographics

2020 census

As of the 2020 United States Census, there were 1,480 people, 708 households, and 442 families residing in the city.

2000 census
As of the census of 2000, there were 1,595 people, 657 households, and 428 families residing in the city. The racial makeup of the city was 56.80% White, 42.19% Black, 0.06% American Indian, 0.38% Asian, 0.13% from other races, and 0.44% from two or more races. Hispanic or Latino of any race were 1.13% of the population.

There were 610 households, out of which 32.3% had children under the age of 18 living with them, 43.8% were married couples living together, 22.8% had a female householder with no husband present, and 29.8% were non-families. 27.7% of all households were made up of individuals, and 15.9% had someone living alone who was 65 years of age or older.  The average household size was 2.50 and the average family size was 3.05.

In the city, the population was spread out, with 26.1% under the age of 18, 8.5% from 18 to 24, 28.0% from 25 to 44, 21.4% from 45 to 64, and 16.0% who were 65 years of age or older.  The median age was 36 years. For every 100 females, there were 83.1 males.  For every 100 females age 18 and over, there were 78.9 males.

The median income for a household in the city was $30,074, and the median income for a family was $34,943. Males had a median income of $28,750 versus $19,375 for females. The per capita income for the city was $15,428.  About 15.8% of families and 19.2% of the population were below the poverty line, including 27.1% of those under age 18 and 21.1% of those age 65 or over.

Education

Lincoln County School District 
The Lincoln County School District holds pre-school to grade twelve, and consists of an elementary school, a middle school, and a high school. The district has 98 full-time teachers and over 1,450 students.
Lincoln County Elementary School
Lincoln County Middle School
Lincoln County High School

Notable people
Barney Bussey, former NFL player
Jeff and Sheri Easter, musicians
Garrison Hearst, former NFL player
Little Roy Lewis and The Lewis Family, gospel bluegrass musicians
Lizzy Long, bluegrass/gospel musician, The Little Roy and Lizzy Show
Pettis Norman, former NFL player
Jarius Wynn, Buffalo Bills defensive end

See also

Central Savannah River Area
Providence Ferry, Georgia

References

External links

 Lincolnton, Georgia City Hall

Cities in Georgia (U.S. state)
Cities in Lincoln County, Georgia
County seats in Georgia (U.S. state)